The Rough Guide To Psychedelic Africa is a world music compilation album originally released in 2012 featuring 1960s and 1970s African popular music. Part of the World Music Network Rough Guides series, the album contains two discs: an overview of the genre on Disc One, and a "bonus" Disc Two highlighting Victor Uwaifo. Disc One features three Nigerian tracks, two Guinean, and one each from Benin, Ethiopia, Tanzania, Senegal, Ghana, and Mali. The compilation was compiled by Dominic Raymond-Barker and Phil Stanton, co-founder of the World Music Network.

Critical reception

The album was met with mixed to positive reviews, with criticism focusing on the title. Chris Nickson of AllMusic called the use of the term "psychedelia" "elastic". Robin Denselow of The Guardian wrote in the same vein, saying it was "more good-time dance music than freak-out," while Richard Gehr of Spin said it was "less Hendrix than 'Mystic Moods'".

Track listing

Disc One

Disc Two
All tracks on Disc Two are performed by Victor Uwaifo.

References

External links
 
 

2012 compilation albums
World Music Network Rough Guide albums